HMS Chichester was a 70-gun third rate ship of the line of the Royal Navy, designed by Sir Joseph Allin and built by Peirson Lock at Portsmouth Dockyard to the standard draught for 70-gun ships as specified in the 1745 Establishment amended in 1750, and launched on 4 June 1753.

In late 1757 or early 1758 Chichester, Captain William Saltern Willett, captured the French privateer snow Actiffe, of Dunkirk. Actiffe, of about 140 tons (bm), was pierced for 12 guns but had nine mounted, plus eight swivel guns. She was to be sold by the candle at Lloyd's Coffee House on 11 April 1758.

Because Chichester served in the navy's Egyptian campaign between 8 March 1801 and 2 September, her officers and crew qualified for the clasp "Egypt" to the Naval General Service Medal that the Admiralty authorized in 1850 to all surviving claimants.

Chichester served until 1803, when she was broken up.

Notes, citations, and references
Notes

Citations

References

Lavery, Brian (2003) The Ship of the Line - Volume 1: The development of the battlefleet 1650-1850. Conway Maritime Press. .

Ships of the line of the Royal Navy
1753 ships